Edom is a city in Van Zandt County, Texas, United States. The population was 375 at the 2010 census.

Geography

Edom is located at  (32.377611, –95.616485).

According to the United States Census Bureau, the city has a total area of 4.2 square miles (10.8 km2), of which, 4.2 square miles (10.7 km2) of it is land and 0.04 square miles (0.1 km2) of it (0.48%) is water.

Demographics

As of the census of 2000, there were 322 people, 126 households, and 86 families residing in the city. The population density was 77.6 people per square mile (30.0/km2). There were 141 housing units at an average density of 34.0 per square mile (13.1/km2). The racial makeup of the city was 95.03% White, 0.31% Native American, 3.73% from other races, and 0.93% from two or more races. Hispanic or Latino of any race were 12.42% of the population.

There were 126 households, out of which 29.4% had children under the age of 18 living with them, 58.7% were married couples living together, 8.7% had a female householder with no husband present, and 31.0% were non-families. 25.4% of all households were made up of individuals, and 16.7% had someone living alone who was 65 years of age or older. The average household size was 2.56 and the average family size was 3.14.

In the city, the population was spread out, with 26.4% under the age of 18, 4.7% from 18 to 24, 28.0% from 25 to 44, 23.9% from 45 to 64, and 17.1% who were 65 years of age or older. The median age was 40 years. For every 100 females, there were 87.2 males. For every 100 females age 18 and over, there were 82.3 males.

The median income for a household in the city was $34,375, and the median income for a family was $50,714. Males had a median income of $31,875 versus $23,750 for females. The per capita income for the city was $14,343. About 10.2% of families and 12.7% of the population were below the poverty line, including 16.1% of those under age 18 and 11.9% of those age 65 or over.

Education
The City of Edom is served by the Van Independent School District.

External links
 Edom Texas: History, Photos, Area Attractions, Map

References

Cities in Texas
Cities in Van Zandt County, Texas